The 1980 Indian Federation Cup Final was the 4th final of the Indian Federation Cup, the top knock-out competition in India, and was contested between Kolkata giants East Bengal and Mohun Bagan on 8 May 1980 at the Eden Gardens in Kolkata.

Both the teams were announced as joint winners after the match ended 1–1 after the regulation time.

Route to the final

Match

Summary
The Federation Cup final began at the Eden Gardens in Kolkata in front of a packed crowd as two Kolkata giants East Bengal and Mohun Bagan faced each other in the Kolkata Derby. The match for fierce and full of fights, as both teams played a physical game. Referee J. P. Coutinho had to flash out four yellow cards to the players: Majid Bishkar, Jamshid Nassiri, Kajal Chatterjee, and Compton Dutta. East Bengal scored the first goal of the match after Mohammed Habib scored in the twenty-fourth minute of the match with a powerful header from an unmarked position inside the box from a corner kick. Mohun Bagan equalized in the sixty-sixth minute after Mihir Bose scored with a half-volley from inside the box. The match ended 1–1 in regulation time but as prior decided, the extra 15 minutes were not played and both the teams were announced as joint champions of the Federation Cup. Referee J. P. Coutinho explained the decision was taken due to poor visibility and lack of lights.

Details

See also
 India - List of Federation Cup Winners

References

East Bengal Club matches
Mohun Bagan AC matches
Indian Federation Cup Finals